Roy Edward Sievers (November 18, 1926 – April 3, 2017) was an American professional baseball player. He played in Major League Baseball (MLB) as a first baseman and left fielder from  through . A five-time All-Star, Sievers was the  American League home run leader and RBI champion. He played for the St. Louis Browns, Washington Senators, Chicago White Sox, Philadelphia Phillies, and the expansion Washington Senators. Sievers batted and threw right-handed.

Biography
Sievers was born in St. Louis, Missouri, in 1926; he was nicknamed "Squirrel" as a schoolboy basketball star. He won the American League (AL) Rookie of the Year and TSN Rookie of the Year awards in 1949, batting .306 with 16 home runs and 75 RBI for the St. Louis Browns. His average fell to .238 in 1950, and for the next three years he suffered shoulder and arm injuries that limited his playing time to a total of 134 games. He was traded to the Washington Senators for Gil Coan before the  season.

In Washington, Sievers collected 95 or more RBI and played at least 144 games during five consecutive years (1954–58) and made the AL All-Star team three times (1956–57, 1959). He finished third in the MVP ballot (behind Mickey Mantle and Ted Williams) with four first-place votes and 205 points. On April 4, Sievers went to the Chicago White Sox in a trade that sent Earl Battey and Don Mincher to Washington. In his first year with the Sox, he hit .295 with 28 home runs and 93 RBI, and had almost an identical season in 1961, hitting .295 with 27 home runs and 92 RBI, making his fourth All-Star appearance. From 1962 to 1964, Sievers remained productive with the Philadelphia Phillies in the National League. He returned to Washington when his contract was sold by the Phillies to the expansion Senators on July 16, 1964. He played his final game on May 9, 1965.

Ned Garver, who pitched in the American League during the 1950s, considered Sievers the best first baseman in the league during that time. Sal Maglie, star pitcher for the New York Giants who specialized in throwing the curveball, used Sievers as an example of a curveball hitter in a 1958 article for Sports Illustrated.

At the time of his death in 2017, Sievers was the oldest living member of the expansion Senators team. At a time when achieving 300 home runs was still a rarity, he became only the 22nd ballplayer to reach the plateau; he is also the earliest to hit 300 career home runs and not eventually be elected to the Baseball Hall of Fame.  In a 17-season career, Sievers was a .267 hitter with 318 home runs, 1,703 hits, and 1,147 RBI, in 1,887 games. Defensively, he compiled a career .989 fielding percentage. After his playing career ended, he served one season (1966) as a coach for the Cincinnati Reds and managed in the minor leagues. Sievers was one of only nine players to don the uniform of both the original and expansion Washington Senators teams, the others being Rudy Hernández, Héctor Maestri, Don Mincher, Camilo Pascual, Pedro Ramos, Johnny Schaive, Zoilo Versalles, and Hal Woodeshick.

Sievers died in his home in Spanish Lake, Missouri, on April 3, 2017, age 90.

Highlights
4-time All-Star (1956–57, 1959, 1961)
AL Rookie of the Year (1949)
Set seasonal and career records in home runs for the Senators:
42, in 1957
180, in 3,547 at-bats

See also
Sporting News Rookie of the Year Award
List of Major League Baseball career home run leaders
List of Major League Baseball career runs batted in leaders
List of Major League Baseball annual runs batted in leaders
List of Major League Baseball annual home run leaders

References

External links

Roy Sievers at SABR (Baseball BioProject)
Roy Sievers at Baseball Almanac
Roy Sievers at Baseball Library

1926 births
2017 deaths
American League All-Stars
American League home run champions
American League RBI champions
Baseball players from St. Louis
Chicago White Sox players
Cincinnati Reds coaches
Elmira Pioneers players
Hannibal Pilots players
Major League Baseball first base coaches
Major League Baseball first basemen
Major League Baseball left fielders
Major League Baseball Rookie of the Year Award winners
Minor league baseball managers
Philadelphia Phillies players
St. Louis Browns players
San Antonio Missions players
Springfield Browns players
Washington Senators (1901–1960) players
Washington Senators (1961–1971) players